Tage Madsen (1919–2004) was male badminton player from Denmark.

Madsen won the All England Open Badminton Championships, considered the unofficial World Badminton Championships, in men's singles in 1939.

References
All England champions 1899-2007
Profile on Badminton Denmark

Danish male badminton players
1919 births
2004 deaths
Indian national badminton champions